Roy Jacob Lopez (born August 7, 1997) is an American football defensive tackle for the Houston Texans of the National Football League (NFL). He played college football at New Mexico State before transferring to Arizona and was drafted by the Texans in the sixth round of the 2021 NFL Draft.

College career

Lopez was ranked as a twostar recruit by 247Sports.com coming out of high school. He committed to New Mexico State on August 23, 2016. Lopez broke his leg in the first week of the 2019 season and returned only briefly at the end of the season. He was granted a fifth year of eligibility and transferred to Arizona on July 19, 2020.

Professional career
Lopez was drafted by the Houston Texans in the sixth round with the 195th pick of the 2021 NFL Draft on May 1, 2021. On May 12, 2021, Lopez officially signed with the Texans. During a November 7, 2021 game against the Miami Dolphins, he sacked quarterback Jacoby Brissett and later recovered a fumble forced by teammate Kamu Grugier-Hill. They were the first sack and first takeaway of his professional career.

Personal life
Lopez is of Mexican-American descent. His mother and several other members of his family are police officers.

References

Living people
Arizona Wildcats football players
Houston Texans players
Players of American football from Arizona
Sportspeople from Tempe, Arizona
New Mexico State Aggies football players
American football defensive linemen
1997 births
American sportspeople of Mexican descent